is a female Japanese popular music artist.  She has also written songs for Iwao Junko and Iwasaki Hiromi.

Discography

Singles
 "Mai" (21 August 1982)
 "Kohihausu nite" (5 March 1983)
 "Suisaiga" (21 July 1983)
 "Ichigo no Kaze" (21 April 1984)
 "Otoko to Onna de" (5 March 1985)
 "Yume no mama no Yutopia" (5 June 1985) - A duet with Matsuzaki Makoto

Albums
 Towairaito no Kaze (LP:5 November 1982) (CD:21 April 1985) - Re-released by Yamaha Music Communications on December 12, 2001
 Kaze ha Kimagure (LP:21 August 1983) (CD:22 October 2003)
 Akai Pedhikyua (LP:5 June 1984) (CD:22 October 2003)
 Intrigue (LP:25 April 1985) (CD:5 November 1985) - Re-released by King Records on October 22, 2003
 High noon High moon (5 September 1987)
 TRICTRAC - Aiso Haruhi Best Selection (21 November 1987)
 Taiyō no Gochiso (21 April 1988)
 Uchu no Kioku (5 November 1988)
 Aiso Haruhi Collection (26 November 1999)
 Tsuki no Kodomo (24 December 2000)
 Shiawase ni Narou (25 December 2002)
 Aiso Haruhi Best (26 March 2003)

External links
 Aiso Haruhi Website

1964 births
Japanese pop musicians
Living people
Musicians from Shizuoka Prefecture
People from Hamamatsu